The Chimes is a 1914 British silent drama film directed by Thomas Bentley and starring Stewart Rome, Violet Hopson and Warwick Buckland. It was based on the 1844 novel The Chimes by Charles Dickens.

Cast
 Stewart Rome as Richard
 Violet Hopson as Meg Veck
 Warwick Buckland as Trotty Veck
 Harry Gilbey as Sir Richard Bowley
 Johnny Butt as Alderman Cute
 John MacAndrews as Will Fern
 Muriel Smith as Lillian

Bibliography
 Giddings, Robert & Sheen, Erica. From Page To Screen: Adaptations of the Classic Novel . Manchester University Press, 5 May 2000
 Mee, John. The Cambridge Introduction to Charles Dickens. Cambridge University Press, 2010.

External links

1914 films
1910s historical drama films
British historical drama films
1910s English-language films
Films directed by Thomas Bentley
British silent short films
Films based on British novels
Films based on works by Charles Dickens
Films set in the 1840s
Hepworth Pictures films
British black-and-white films
1914 drama films
1910s British films
Silent drama films